Grand Hôtel Les Trois Rois (Hotel of the Three Kings) in Basel, until 1986 usually identified by its German-language name, Hotel Drei Könige, is often cited as one of Switzerland's oldest hotels. It is located on the left bank of the Rhine, a few paces downstream of the city's first bridge across the river.

Early history
Before the railways were built, the Rhine was the most important trade artery in western Europe, and Basel was the principal terminal point at its southern end. Beside the transshipment jetties where merchandise was off-loaded from the boats on the northeast bank of the river, there was already a guest house, identified in 1255 as "domus zem blumen in vico crucis" "(House of Flowers at the cross street)", which was probably a decade or so after the ferry crossings of the river were complemented at this point by a road bridge. However, the guest house and adjacent buildings had to be demolished after the 1356 earthquake.

The first surviving record of a hotel on this site with its modern name dates from 1681, where the "Drei Könige" Inn was identified as a place where itinerant merchants lodged. The name "Drei Könige" means "Three kings" and is a popular name for city hotels in Switzerland and southern Germany. It is thought to be a reference to the Magi (popularly, "Three Kings") who visited Jesus shortly after His birth:  the Magi, like the merchants who stayed overnight in medieval hotels, were notable for the precious merchandise they carried with them.

In 1841–42 the entire site was acquired by Johann Jakob Senn, hitherto a successful master tailor who foresaw possibilities for a massive expansion in leisure travel that would follow from the revolutions in transportation brought about by the river steamer and the coming of the railways.  Senn demolished the hotel and had it rebuilt in a much more luxurious style, employing the fashionable Basel architect  to design what would later be seen as an early example of Belle Époque architecture. The rebuilt hotel reopened on 16 February 1844. From then on it would present itself as a "Grand Hotel", with a guest list that included many leading figures from the worlds of politics and the arts.

Later history
In 1915 the southern block of the hotel building was sold to the Basler Kantonalbank and renovated appropriately. Twenty-three years later, in 1938, the bankers moved out and this building became the City Tourist Information Office. In 2004 the hotel, together with the block that had been separated off and sold to the bank in 1915, was acquired by entrepreneur and dental implants magnate Thomas Straumann. The hotel was closed down for two years while it was comprehensively rebuilt, incorporating the southern block and with a view to recapturing as much as possible the reality of the 1844 original, but only insofar as this was possible without abandoning the more modern luxury features considered appropriate for the 21st century. The hotel reopened on 20 March 2006. In 2012 Straumann announced that he was looking for a buyer for the hotel. Disappointingly, a suitable buyer had still not been found two years later, and in December 2014 it was announced that the hotel was no longer for sale.

Celebrity clientele
Political leaders who have stayed at the hotel include Willy Brandt, Helmut Schmidt, Valéry Giscard d'Estaing, and the Dalai Lama. Heads of state claimed as guests include King Farouk of Egypt and Queen Elizabeth II. In 1798 Napoleon Bonaparte had a business lunch here with Basel officials "to discuss French-Swiss relations". A more recent guest was Britain's General Montgomery. Guests from the worlds of the arts and literature have included Voltaire, Jean-Paul Sartre, Charles Dickens, Herbert von Karajan, Duke Ellington, and Marc Chagall.  Theodor Herzl stayed at the hotel in August 1897 while attending the First Zionist Congress. The American scientist and philosopher Charles S. Peirce stayed there in January 1870.

The composer and conductor Pierre Boulez was awakened by police at six in the morning in his room at the Hotel Les Trois Rois late in 2001; the officers confiscated his passport and disappeared. In 1967, Boulez had given an interview to Der Spiegel in which he said that "the opera houses should be blown up". The law enforcement officials picked up on it during a routine check of hotel guest registrations. The passport was returned after a few hours.

References

External links

Hotels in Switzerland
Buildings and structures in Basel
Cultural heritage of Switzerland
Buildings and structures completed in 1681
1681 establishments in Europe
17th-century establishments in Switzerland